Rodrigo Gavela Rodríguez (born January 5, 1966 in Fabero del Bierzo, León) is a former long-distance athlete from Spain, who finished in 18th position (2:16.23) in the men's marathon at the 1992 Summer Olympics in Barcelona, Spain.

Achievements
All results regarding marathon, unless stated otherwise

References
 Spanish Olympic Committee

1966 births
Living people
Spanish male long-distance runners
Olympic athletes of Spain
Athletes (track and field) at the 1992 Summer Olympics